Sade Live (also known as the Once in a Lifetime Tour or the Soldier of Love Tour) is the sixth concert tour by British band Sade. Visiting Europe, the Americas, Australia and Asia the tour supports the band's sixth studio album, Soldier of Love and their second compilation album, The Ultimate Collection. This trek marked the band's first tour in nearly a decade. The tour ranked 27th in Pollstar's "Top 50 Worldwide Tour (Mid-Year)", earning over 20 million dollars. At the conclusion of 2011, the tour placed tenth on Billboard's annual, "Top 25 Tours", earning over $50 million with 59 shows.

Background and response
The tour was officially announced on 30 September 2010 via press release. Shortly, media outlets began to buzz over the tour. Concurrently, the announcement of the tour followed the band's recent studio album, Soldier of Love, certified platinum in the United States. Advertised as a world tour, the initial announcement showed ten dates in the Southeastern United States. Soon after, dates in the United Kingdom and Europe were announced as well—giving the band its first performances in nearly two decades. At the start of 2011, the album was nominated for two Grammy Awards, prompting the band to add additional dates in the U.S.. During this time, American recording artist John Legend was revealed to be the opening act for the North American leg of the tour. Additional dates in Europe and North America followed. Frontwoman, Sade, described touring as being on a thrill ride at an amusement park. She further commented, "Once you’re on the ride, you’re so involved in it that it's almost too late to say, 'What am I doing?’ In some ways, I'm already psyched up [for the tour]. You have to know that it's going to be good to bring yourself to do it."

To introduce the tour, Adu stated: "You can never translate the reality of a show, which is good. I like to think this tour will be better than ever. We’re aiming high", she said. "It's a big production. It's going to be quite theatrical and hopefully visually do a good service to the songs and represent them well and take you somewhere. Hopefully, when people leave, they’ll leave with something."

Billboard magazine devoted its August 2011 cover story to the tour, highlighting details of the tour and its financial response. Sade's longtime collaborator Sophie Muller served as creative director of the tour while Baz Halpin (known for his work on tours by P!nk and Tina Turner) handled production and lighting design (including the jumbo LED screen that flashed imagery behind Sade while she's performed). According to the Billboard cover story, from 16 June to 14 August, the tour had grossed 
$31.4 million and drew 345,441 concert-goers to 36 concerts, of which 16 were sell-outs. As of 1 June, the band ranked as the eighth highest-grossing tour based on reported boxscores and ranked number-seven in concerts for ticket prices for the band range from $20 to $180 in various markets. Due to the success of the tour, new dates were added in Australia which marked the band's second tour there in almost twenty years.

Broadcasts and recordings

During the American leg of Sade's 2011 tour, British director, Sophie Muller, captured the band's two-hour show for release on DVD, with accompanying Live CD. In addition to the concert, Sade also granted rare glimpses of behind-the-stage scenes with a 20-minute documentary, exclusive candid moments, a short technical documentary by Stuart Matthewman, and outtakes from the crew.

Opening acts
The Jolly Boys (first European leg)
John Legend (North America)

Setlist

"Soldier of Love"
"Your Love Is King"
"Skin"
"Kiss of Life"
"Love is Found"
"In Another Time"
"Smooth Operator"
"Jezebel"
"Bring Me Home"
"Is It a Crime"
"Love is Stronger Than Pride" (after first leg only) / Still in Love With You (first leg only)
"All About Our Love"
Medley: "Paradise" / "Nothing Can Come Between Us"
"Morning Bird"
"King of Sorrow"
"The Sweetest Taboo"
"The Moon and the Sky"
"Pearls"
"No Ordinary Love"
"By Your Side"
Encore
"Cherish the Day"

Tour dates

Festivals and other miscellaneous performances
This concert was a part of the Montreal International Jazz Festival
This concert is a part of "A Day on the Green"
This concert is a part of "Yas Island Weekends"

Cancellations and rescheduled shows

Box office score data

External links
Sade Official Website

References

Sade (band) concert tours
2011 concert tours